Seo Min-woo (February 8, 1985 – March 25, 2018) was a South Korean idol singer and actor. He was a member of the South Korean boy band 100% under the label of TOP Media, as the leader and vocalist.

Career

Pre-debut
In 2009, Seo was featured during Andy's promotion for his song "Single Man", along with Jumper'''s second member Park Dong-min. Seo has also been active as an actor. He starred in KBS2's 2006 drama Sharp 3 and SBS' 2007 drama The King and I, and also did cameos for New Tales of Gisaeng in episode 12 and two movies, Crazy Waiting (2007)"The Longest 24 Months (Movie - 2007) - Cast" HanCinema. Retrieved 2012-10-01. and Where Are You Going? (2009).

2013: Love and War 2, 100%

In 2013, Seo made a cameo in KBS2's drama, Marriage Clinic: Love and War 2.

Seo was chosen as a member of the group 100%, the seven member South Korean boy group that debuted in September 2012 under Andy Lee's company TOP Media with their first single album We, 100%''.

2014: military service
On March 4, 2014, Seo enlisted in the military for his mandatory military service. He enlisted as an active-duty soldier.
Seo was discharged after 21 months, on December 3, 2015.

Death
On March 25, 2018, Seo was found in his home in Gangnam in a state of cardiac arrest. Emergency responders declared him dead on arrival. Seo's funeral was held on March 27, 2018.

Filmography

Films

TV series

References

External links

1985 births
2018 deaths
South Korean male singers
South Korean male idols
South Korean pop singers
People from Daegu
Deaths in South Korea